is a Japanese actress and former singer. In March 2017, she landed the lead role in NHK's 97th Asadora, Warotenka, which aired from October 2017 to March 2018.

Career

2009–2012: Early career
Aoi was scouted in Harajuku, Tokyo, in her fifth year of elementary school. She had been taking photos to send with her audition documents at the time. She made her television debut in 2009 through a FamilyMart commercial and made her acting debut in the TV series Samurai High School. Her next appearance came in January 2010, where she played young Mamako Ino in an episode of the TV series Angel Bank. The following month, she played Caroline Izumi in TV Asahi's 2 hour long television special Kasai Chōsakan Renjirō Kurenai. She reprised her role as Caroline Izumi in November 2010, January 2012, and November 2012. Her character then returned to America.

2013–present
In December 2012, Aoi was chosen to be a member of the new idol group Otome Shinto, along with Chika Arakawa, Yurika Takahashi, and Ayame Tajiri. The group made their CD debut two months later with the single "Mousou☆Koukan Nikki". Aoi left the group in July 2014 to focus on acting.

In 2013, she played small roles in Aibō Season 11 and Taberu Dake. Later that year, she played young Mao Waratai in Takahiro Miki's fantasy romance film Girl in the Sunny Place. The film received positive reviews and Aoi gained attention for her performance. The following year, she played a supporting role in the adventure film Samurai Pirates, portraying the main character's classmate. Next, she played small roles in the TV series Divine Retribution: Punisher of Darkness, Aoi Honō, Binta!, and Woman won't allow it. Aoi gained attention for her appearances in commercials for Tokio Marine Nichido and Yamazaki Biscuits. In March 2014, she placed 3rd place in the 35th Kodansha Advertising Awards for the category "New Talent".

In 2015, she played supporting roles in films Kuchibiru ni uta o and Tsumi no Yohaku, and in the TV series Omotesando Koukou Gasshoubu!. In March 2016, she starred alongside Yoko Moriguchi in the TV series Joyu Ochi. The following month, she starred in the horror film Horror no Tenshi. She was named the new "CM queen" in November.

In March 2017, she landed the lead role in NHK's 97th Asadora Warotenka, portraying Ten Fujioka. Warotenka is set during the late Meiji era to post-World War II period. Her character was modelled after Sei Yoshimoto, the founder of entertainment conglomerate Yoshimoto Kogyo. On December 12, 2017, she hosted the year-end music program Waga Kokoro no Osaka Melody. From April to June 2018, Aoi played nurse Miwa Hanabusa in the TBS medical drama series Black Pean, appearing alongside Kazunari Ninomiya and Ryoma Takeuchi. Her performance earned her a Television Drama Academy Award nomination.

Aoi will make her stage debut in February 2019 at the Tokyo International Forum, as Juliet in the musical version of Romeo and Juliet. She will then play Anya in the musical Anastasia.

Personal life
Aoi was born in Kanagawa, Japan. In January 2017, Aoi was accepted to Keio University. She is studying policy studies.

Filmography

Film

Television drama

Other television

Dubbing
Cats, Grizabella the Glamour Cat (Jennifer Hudson)

Awards and nominations

References

External links
 Official profile 
 
 

1998 births
Actresses from Kanagawa Prefecture
Living people
Stardust Promotion artists
Asadora lead actors
Japanese female idols